The Mill River is a tributary of the Taunton River that flows 4.0 miles (6.2 km) from Lake Sabbatia, through the center of Taunton, Massachusetts, to the Taunton River.

See also
List of Massachusetts rivers
Taunton River Watershed
Whittenton Pond Dam

References

External links

Taunton River Stewardship Program: The Wildlands Trust of Southeastern Massachusetts
Taunton River Watershed Alliance
University of Rhode Island: Taunton River Watershed critical resource atlas.

Greater Taunton Area
Rivers of Bristol County, Massachusetts
Taunton River watershed
Taunton, Massachusetts
Rivers of Massachusetts